The Headies Award for Best Vocal Performance (Female) is an award presented at The Headies, a ceremony that was established in 2006 and originally called the Hip Hop World Awards. First presented to Ego in 2006, the category is one of six categories not open to public voting.

Recipients

Category records
Most wins

Most nominations

Notes

References

The Headies
Music awards honoring women